The Culmer White was a 19th-century lifeboat of the Isle of Thanet, Kent, England.

With its sister boat, the Mary White, it took part in the rescue of the Northern Belle in January 1857. The Belle was an American transatlantic ship which ran aground near Thanet in blizzard conditions. Both the Culmer White and the Mary White made repeated trips to the damaged Belle and saved the entire crew.

References 

 

Lifeboats
Shipwrecks in the Downs
Maritime incidents in 1851